Bhima Bhoi (1850–1895) was a 19th-century saint, poet and philosopher from the state of Odisha in India, most known for his songs on the philosophical aspects of Mahima Dharma. Bhima Bhoi was a bhakta (Odia: devotee) of Mahima Gosain, the founder of Satya Mahima Dharma, an Indian religious tradition that challenged the authority of caste and other forms of discrimination.

Early life
Bhima Bhoi was born in [madhupur in redhakhol ]] in 1850, though various sources have cited different years as well as different places of birth. Bhima Bhoi's family belonged to the Kondh tribe. Bhoi's family was not well off and by most accounts his early life was not a happy one. His father died when he was quite young. His mother remarried and had children with her new husband soon after.

Notable works 
Bhima Bhoi was a popular poet, composer and singer. Humanity and liberation of the world based on the philosophy of Mahima Dharma were the central theme of his poetic creations. His assertion "mo jeevana pachhe narke padithau, jagata uddhara heu" (let my life rot in naraka if necessary, but let the world be redeemed)  showcases his dedication to the upliftment of the societally deprived while being a clear reflection of socio-economic conditions in the State, during his lifetime. While scholars have studied the life and poetry of Bhima Bhoi, research chairs have recently been established at Kalinga Institute of Social Sciences - Deemed to be University (in April 2018) and Gangadhar Meher University in 2019, to research the impact of Bhima Bhoi's life and philosophy in Odisha.

In honour of Bhima Bhoi, Bolangir Medical College is named Bhima Bhoi Medical College.

Further reading 
 Bannerjee, Ishita and Johannes Beltz 2008 (eds.), Popular Religion and Ascetic Practices : New studies on Mahima Dharma, New Delhi: Manohar Publishers.
 Bäumer, Bettina and Johannes Beltz 2010 (eds.), Verses from the Void: Mystic poetry of an Oriya saint, New Delhi: Manohar Publishers.
 Beltz, Johannes. 2003. Bhima Bhoi: The making of a modern saint.
 A. Copley (ed.) Hindu Nationalism and Religious Reform Movements, New Delhi: OUP, pp. 230–253.
 Mahapatra, Sitakant. 1983. Bhima Bhoi. New Delhi: Sahitya Akademi (Makers of Indian Literature).

References

1850 births
1895 deaths
Hindu poets
19th-century Hindu religious leaders
19th-century Indian musicians
19th-century Indian poets
Indian male songwriters
Odia-language writers
Poets from Odisha
People from Sambalpur district
Indian male poets
19th-century Indian male writers
Hinduism in Odisha
19th-century male musicians
19th-century musicians
Shudra Hindu saints
Odia Hindu saints